Anorexia athletica (sports anorexia), also referred to as hypergymnasia, is an eating disorder characterized by excessive and compulsive exercise. An athlete with sports anorexia tends to overexercise to give themselves a sense of having control over their body. Most often, people with the disorder tend to feel they have no control over their lives other than their control of food and exercise. In actuality, they have no control; they cannot stop exercising or regulating food intake without feeling guilty. Generally, once the activity is started, it is difficult to stop because the person is seen as being addicted to the method adopted.

Anorexia athletica is used to refer to "a disorder for athletes who engage in at least one unhealthy method of weight control". Unlike anorexia nervosa, anorexia athletica does not have as much to do with body image as it does with performance. Athletes usually begin by eating more 'healthy' foods, as well as increasing their training, but when people feel like that is not enough and start working out excessively and cutting back their caloric intake until it becomes a psychological disorder.
 
Hypergymnasia and anorexia athletica are not recognized as mental disorders in any of the medical manuals, such as the ICD-10 or the DSM-IV, nor is it part of the proposed revision of this manual, the DSM-5. If this were the case, there would be a 10–15% increase in mental disorders in sports.  A study at the Anorexia Centre at Huddinge Hospital in Stockholm, Sweden showed that sports anorexia can result in mental disorders. The anxiety, stress, and pressure people with sports anorexia put on themselves (as well as the pressure parents and coaches can put on the athlete) can cause mental disorders.

Signs and symptoms
Someone with anorexia athletica can experience numerous signs and symptoms, a few of which are listed below. The seriousness of the symptoms is dependent on the individual, and more symptoms come with the length the athlete excessively exercises. If anorexia athletica persists for long enough, the individual can become malnourished, which eventually leads to further complications in major organs such as the liver, kidney, heart and brain. 
Excessive exercise 
 Obsessive behavior with calories, fat, and weight 
 Self-worth is based on physical performance 
 Enjoyment of sports is diminished or gone
 Denying the over exercising is a problem

Causes
There is not one single cause of anorexia athletica, but many factors that are involved in the disorder. Research has shown that an area on chromosome 1 is linked to anorexia nervosa-sports anorexia.  Thus, a person is more likely to have anorexia athletica if someone in their immediate family has had the disorder. Not only genetics, but also the environment a person is in, has a major impact on the disorder. Coaches and parents often suggest to their athlete/child to lose weight in order to perform better. Sports such as figure skating, ballet, and gymnastics promote both male and female athletes to have a thin figure. Other research has grouped sports according to the characteristics that may increase the prevalence in certain types of sports. For example the pursuit of a certain body aesthetic in gymnastics, the need to be in a certain weight categorisation in order to compete in judo or endurance sports such as running where weight and performance are closely linked.  Females who partake in sports can develop a syndrome known as the triad. The female athlete triad was recognized in 1992 and is defined as a spectrum disorder of three interrelated components: (1) low energy availability due to disordered eating, eating disorder, or lack of nutrition relative to caloric expenditure; (2) menstrual dysfunction; and (3) low bone mineral density (BMD).  The media play a very significant role in pressuring athletes to have the perfect body and to be thin, which can also trigger sports anorexia.

Treatment
According to the National Eating Disorder Information Centre (NEDIC), the first step for someone going through anorexia athletica is to realize their eating and exercise habits are hurting them. Once an individual has realized they have a disorder, an appointment should be made with the family doctor. A family doctor can advise further medical attention if needed. With sports anorexia, it is important to go to a dietitian as well as a personal trainer. People with sports anorexia need to learn the balance between exercise and caloric intake.

See also
Eating disorders
Exercise addiction
Exercise bulimia
Female athlete triad syndrome
Overtraining

References

Culture-bound syndromes
Eating disorders
Sports nutrition